The Independent Permanent Human Rights Commission (IPHRC;) is a human right agency and one of the principal organs of the Organisation of Islamic Cooperation advocating for human rights within the scope of its 57 member states. It takes activities as an independent commission of the OIC and also advise its policymaking bodies and decision-making authority within the framework of human rights and fundamental rights.

The IPHRC serves for member and non-member states on the existing human rights mechanism under the international standards outlined for independence and professionalism as per its mandate granted by the OIC's charter in various sessions first session being held between 7 and 8 December 2005 in the 3rd Extraordinary Islamic Summit hosted by Saudi Arabia  Mecca.

History 
The Independent Permanent Human Rights Commission (IPHRC) was commissioned in 2005 after the OIC Council of Foreign Ministers held a programme titled "OIC Ten-Year Programme of Action". A resolution was adopted by the 3rd Extraordinary Islamic Summit held in Mecca, Saudi Arabia on 7 December 2005. However, the partial formation of the commission took place by 11th Islamic Summit which was hosted between 13 and 14 March 2008 by Senegal in Dakar. It was formally created by the 38th session of the Council of Foreign Ministers between 28 and 30 June 2011 in Astana, Kazakhstan.

After the commission was officially recognised by the member states, its Secretariat was moved to its headquarters in March 2017. The independent headquarter building was given by Saudi Arabia which also serves as its host country. The commission has also set up principle guidelines to be made functional. The five guidelines include; the principles of complementarity, introspection, prioritization, incremental measures and credibility.

In the first five years, the commission focused on critical issues concerning women's and children's rights in the field of education. The commission identified right to education as a primary component for the rights of women and children. The IPHRC also identified right to development as one of the main measures for the development. It also identifies islamophobia, Muslim minorities and the Israeli–Palestinian conflict as the critical challenges.

The commission has been actively offering assistance to its member states on several issues concerning domestic legislations and obligations under the international human rights instruments.

Objectives 
The IPHRC actively offer advise to decision-making bodies involving human rights. It also conduct research and studies in the same field, in addition to advocacing for human and fundamental rights of Muslim minority rights of the member and non-member states under the Universal Declaration of Human Rights with additional focus on Islamic principles, justice and equality. It also provides assistance for technical cooperation. The IPHRC is also entrusted with interfaith and intercultural dialogue as an instrumental inception for the promotion of peace and the Islamic values as described in its charter.

It also reviews OIC's human rights activities and provide advise on recommended measures necessary for the improvement of human rights mechanism. The actively collaborates with the United Nations bodies and the OIC itself. It provides support for civil society groups, organizations and individuals associated with the same field. As a cross-regional human rights agency, it promotes universal values of the member and non-member states. It also serves as one of organisations that prevents duplicate publication concerning human rights protection and promotion.

Commission membership 
The IPHRC consists 18 professional human rights trained members. They are elected by the OIC Council of Foreign Ministers from three continents such as Arab, Africa and Asia with 6 members from each continent. Nominated by their own governments, members are elected for a term of three years. A member may serve in the commission only twice and cannot hold the position for the third term. Term is renewable only once.

Sessions 
The IPHRC organise two annual 5 to 10 days long session focused on its principles. Dates are decided by the OIC Secretariat and IPHRC's bureau. OIC's executive director is responsible for the preparation and submission of Draft Agenda and Programme of Works to commission members for the final approval.

Session documents 
Sessions documents consists of reports, proceedings, conclusion and recommendations. The Secretary General of the Organisation of Islamic Cooperation is responsible for the presentation of session report annually to the Council of Foreign Ministers. It contains a comprehensive session report, including IPHRC'S activities.

List of reports

References

External links 

Organisation of Islamic Cooperation organs
2005 establishments in Saudi Arabia
Human rights organisations based in Saudi Arabia
Children's rights organizations
Women's rights organizations
Freedom of expression organizations